Kuperberg is a surname. Notable people with the surname include:

 Włodzimierz Kuperberg (born 1941), professor of mathematics
 Krystyna Kuperberg (born 1944), Polish-American mathematician
 Greg Kuperberg (born 1967), Polish-American mathematician

See also 
 Kupperberg (disambiguation)
 Kupferberg (disambiguation)